Aleksei Shvachko (1901–1988) was a Ukrainian film director.

Selected filmography
 Martin Borulya (1953)
 Far from the Motherland (1960)
 Nina (1972)

References

Bibliography 
 Joshua First. Ukrainian Cinema: Belonging and Identity During the Soviet Thaw. I.B.Tauris, 2014.

External links 
 

1901 births
1988 deaths
Burials at Baikove Cemetery
Ukrainian film directors